Modernism/modernity is a quarterly peer-reviewed academic journal established in 1994 by Lawrence Rainey and Robert von Hallberg.

History
It covers methodological, archival, and theoretical approaches to modernist studies in the long modernist period. Since 2000 it has been the official publication of the Modernist Studies Association.

In February 2014, the journal started operating with two editorial offices: a permanent MSA office and a permanent office at the University of York. It is published quarterly in January, April, September, and November by Johns Hopkins University Press. The journal is also available in digital form through library databases such as Project MUSE.

Content
Each issue includes a section of thematic essays, multi-work review essays, individual book reviews, and a list of "recent books of interest." The journal occasionally has guest-edited or special issues, with a series of related essays on one topic. The journal has also launched an "Out of the Archives" series, in which out-of-print and neglected works of modernism are reintroduced to its readership.

Staff
The current editors-in-chief are ) Christopher Bush (Northwestern University) and Anne Fernald (Fordham University). Previous editors include Debra Rae Cohen (University of South CarolinaAnn Ardis (University of Delaware), Cassandra Laity (Drew University), and Jeffrey Schnapp (Harvard University).

Accolades
In 2003, Modernism/modernity won the Phoenix Award from the Council of Editors of Learned Journals.

References

External links 
 
 Modernist Studies Association
 Review on JSTOR

Modernism
Publications established in 1994
Quarterly journals
Johns Hopkins University Press academic journals
Multidisciplinary humanities journals
English-language journals
Modernity
Academic journals associated with learned and professional societies